Count Mikhail Tarielovich Loris-Melikov (– 24 December 1888) was a Russian-Armenian statesman, General of the Cavalry, and Adjutant General of H. I. M. Retinue.

The Princes of Lori - Loris-Melikovs are the representatives of an old noble family whose ancestors in the 14th century owned the town of Lori and the province of the same name. They belonged to the top aristocratic society of Georgia.   In Russian nobility the princely family of the Loris-Melikovs (is translated from Georgian as “The Princes of Lori”) was approved in 1832.

Biography

Early life
He was born in Tiflis, Caucasus Viceroyalty, Russian Empire in 1826, to Prince Tariel Zurabovich Loris-Melikov and his wife, Princess Ekaterina Ahverdova, and was educated in St Petersburg, first at the Lazarev Institute of Oriental Languages, and afterwards at the Guards' Cadet Institute. He joined a hussar regiment, and four years afterwards (1847) he was sent to the Caucasus, where he remained for more than twenty years, and made for himself during troubled times the reputation of a distinguished cavalry officer and an able administrator. In the latter capacity, though a keen soldier, he aimed always at preparing the warlike and turbulent population committed to his charge for the transition from military to normal civil administration, and in this work his favorite instrument was the schoolmaster.

Military career
In the Russo-Turkish War of 1877-78, he commanded a separate corps d'armée on the Turkish frontier in Asia Minor. After taking the fortress of Ardahan, he was repulsed by Ahmed Muhtar Pasha at Zevin, but subsequently defeated his opponent at Ajaria, took Kars by storm, and laid siege to Erzerum. For these services he received the title of Count. He was awarded the Order of Saint George of the second degree on October 27, 1877, for his service in Ajaria.

Civil administrator

In the following year, Loris-Melikov became the temporary governor-general of the region of the Lower Volga to combat an outbreak of the plague. The measures he adopted proved so effectual that he was transferred to the provinces of Central Russia to combat the Nihilists and Anarchists, who had adopted a policy of terrorism, and had succeeded in assassinating the governor of Kharkiv.

His success in this struggle led to his appointment as chief of the Supreme Administrative Commission which had been created in St Petersburg after the February 1880 assassination attempt on the Tsar to deal with the terrorist agitation in general.
Here, as in the Caucasus, he showed a decided preference for the employment of ordinary legal methods rather than exceptional extralegal measures, even after an attempt on his own life soon afterwards. He believed that the best policy was to strike at the root of the evil by removing the causes of popular discontent and recommended to the emperor Alexander II a large scheme of administrative and economic reforms. Alexander, who was beginning to lose faith in the efficacy of the simple method of police repression hitherto employed, lent a willing ear to the suggestion. When the Supreme Commission was dissolved in August 1880, he appointed Count Loris-Melikov Minister of the Interior with exceptional powers.

The proposed scheme of reforms was at once taken in hand but was never carried out. The emperor signed a ukase creating several commissions, composed of officials and eminent private individuals, to prepare reforms in various branches of the administration, and while popular peoples' representatives from the Zemstvos were granted positions, they were not allowed to vote.  The intellectuals of Russia derided these reforms as rubber-stamping and an unwillingness to put forward any substantial, constitutional reforms. This ukase was designed and advocated by Loris-Melikov, and on the very day (13 March 1881) of its acceptance by the emperor, the emperor was assassinated.  But after the assassination, Loris-Melikov hesitated about publishing the order for a popular commission, and waited for the new tsar, who turned out to be very opposed to a constitution in Russia. Alexander III at once adopted a strongly anti-reformist policy.

When the new Tsar started to undo some of the reforms that his father, Alexander II had promulgated, Count Loris-Melikov resigned several months later and lived in retirement until his death at Nice on 22 December 1888.

See also
Melikov

Notes

References

Further reading

  Wright, Patricia. "Loris-Melikov: Russia, 1880-1." History Today (June 1974), Vol. 24 Issue 6, pp 413–419 online.

External links
 Armenian Aristocracy and the Military Tradition 
 

1825 births
1888 deaths
Military personnel from Tbilisi
People from Georgia Governorate
Georgian people of Armenian descent
Russian nobility
Law enforcement in Russia
Imperial Russian Army generals
Politicians of the Russian Empire
Interior ministers of Russia
Members of the State Council (Russian Empire)
Russian military personnel of the Russo-Turkish War (1877–1878)
Russian people of Armenian descent
Recipients of the Order of Saint Stanislaus (Russian)
Recipients of the Order of St. George of the Second Degree
Recipients of the Order of St. George of the Third Degree
Honorary members of the Saint Petersburg Academy of Sciences
Russian military personnel of the Caucasian War
People from the Russian Empire of Armenian descent